is a British-Japanese professional skateboarder and surfer who competes for Great Britain. She is the youngest professional skateboarder in the world, and has also won the American TV programme Dancing with the Stars: Juniors. She represented Great Britain at the 2020 Summer Olympics, where she won a bronze medal in the park event, making her the country's youngest ever medallist. She won the park event at the 2023 World Skateboarding Championship.

Personal life
Sky Brown was born in Miyazaki, Japan. She is the older sister of Ocean Brown. Her mother, Mieko, is Japanese and her father, Stuart, is British.

Her British father lived in the United States for several years before moving to Japan. Brown lives in Miyazaki, but spends around half the year in the US. Her family are skateboarders, and her preschool had a skate park. She has a skating ramp in her back garden, as there are no skate parks in her home area of Takanabe, Miyazaki. Aside from skateboarding, Brown is interested in surfing.

Career

Brown does not have a skateboarding coach; instead she learns tricks from YouTube. She sometimes practices with Shaun White, who won Olympic snowboarding medals. Brown is sponsored by Nike, making her the youngest Nike-sponsored athlete in the world. She has featured in a Nike campaign alongside Serena Williams and Simone Biles. She is also supported by Almost Skateboards and Skateistan. 

In 2016, at the age of 8, Brown took part in the Vans US Open, making her the youngest person ever to compete at the event. She fell off her skateboard in a heat. In 2017, she came second in the Asian Continental Finals, and she finished in the top 10 of the 2018 Vans Park Series. In 2018, at the age of 10, Brown became a professional athlete, making her the youngest professional skateboarder in the world. The same year, she won the US TV show Dancing with the Stars: Juniors. In February 2019, she won the Simple Session event in Tallinn, Estonia. 

In March 2019, Brown announced that she would be competing for Great Britain, having previously said that she would compete for Japan. Brown said that she favoured the "more relaxed approach" of the British Skateboarding Association. That year, Brown also came third at the World Skateboarding Championship, and became the first female to land a frontside 540 at the X Games. She finished fifth at the X Games skateboarding event. Brown came third at the 2020 Park World Skateboarding Championships in Brazil.

Brown was one of five Britons attempting to qualify for the skateboarding events at the 2020 Summer Olympics, the first time the sport was included in the Games. On 28 May 2020, while training in California, she suffered a "horrific" fall from a halfpipe ramp which left her with several skull fractures and a broken left wrist and hand. She was flown to a hospital and was reported as being unresponsive on arrival. Her father said afterwards that she was "lucky to be alive", whilst Brown herself said it was her worst fall yet. Nevertheless, she remained determined to push boundaries and compete for gold at the Tokyo Olympics. In April 2021, Brown said that she was also considering trying to compete in surfing at the delayed 2020 Olympics.

In June 2021, Brown was selected to represent Great Britain in skateboarding at the 2020 Summer Olympics. Brown was the youngest British Summer Olympian ever, at the age of 13, beating Margery Hinton who was 13 years and 43 days when she competed in the 200 metre breaststroke event at the 1928 Summer Olympics. Brown was not the youngest competitor at the Games: Syrian table tennis player Hend Zaza and Japanese skateboarder Kokona Hiraki are younger. 

In July 2021, she won the X Games women's skateboarding park gold medal. 

Brown won the bronze medal in the women's park skateboarding event at the 2020 Summer Olympics and became Great Britain’s youngest ever medal winner, at the age of 13 years and 28 days. She had fallen over in her first two runs at the event, and scored 56.47 in her final attempt. Brown was not the youngest medallist at the Games, as 12-year-old Kokona Hiraki of Japan won silver in the same event. Later in the year, it was announced that some of Brown's skateboards would be displayed at the renovated Young V&A in London.

In 2022, Brown retained her X Games title, and also won the Dew Tour event for the second year in a row. She won the park event at the 2023 World Skateboarding Championship, thus becoming the first British skateboarding world champion.

Awards
On 19 December 2021, Brown won the 2021 BBC Young Sports Personality of the Year award; she was shortlisted again in 2022. In April 2022, she won the Comeback of the Year award for 2021 at the Laureus World Sports Awards.

Filmography

See also 

 Great Britain at the Olympics

References

External links
 
 Sky Brown at The Boardr
 Sky Brown at SPoT

2008 births
Living people
Female skateboarders
Japanese skateboarders
Sportspeople from Miyazaki Prefecture
British skateboarders
Japanese people of British descent
British people of Japanese descent
Skateboarders at the 2020 Summer Olympics
Olympic skateboarders of Great Britain
Olympic medalists in skateboarding
Medalists at the 2020 Summer Olympics
Olympic bronze medallists for Great Britain
X Games athletes
People from Miyazaki (city)
World Skateboarding Championship medalists